Endre Palócz (23 March 1911 – 11 January 1988) was a Hungarian fencer. He won a bronze medal in the team foil event at the 1952 Summer Olympics.

References

External links
 

1911 births
1988 deaths
Hungarian male foil fencers
Olympic fencers of Hungary
Fencers at the 1948 Summer Olympics
Fencers at the 1952 Summer Olympics
Olympic bronze medalists for Hungary
Olympic medalists in fencing
Martial artists from Budapest
Medalists at the 1952 Summer Olympics